This is a list of Honorary Fellows of Trinity Hall, Cambridge.

Mani Shankar Aiyar
Sarah Bates
Sir David Bean
Sir David Bell
John Broome
Sir Roy Calne
Owen Chadwick
Peter Clarke
David Cleevely 
Sir John Cunningham
Martin Daunton
Edmund de Waal
John Drury
Norman Fowler, Baron Fowler
Angus Glennie, Lord Glennie
Alexander Goehr
Sir Ewan Harper
Stephen Hawking
Mary Hockaday
Peter Holland
Sir Anthony Hooper
Andy Hopper
Sir Brian Hoskins
Geoffrey Howe, Baron Howe of Aberavon
Sir Nicholas Hytner
Antony Jameson
Harriet Lamb
John H. Langbein
Janet Legrand
Sir John Lyons
Andrew Marr
Peter Millett, Baron Millett
Donald Nicholls, Baron Nicholls of Birkenhead
Paul Orchard-Lisle
Ronald Oxburgh, Baron Oxburgh
Cornelia Parker
Sir John Pethica
John Polkinghorne
Sir Colin Rimer
Graham Ross Russell
Walter Scott
Peter Sever
Sir Peregrine Simon
Sir Derek Thomas
John Thomas, Baron Thomas of Cwmgiedd
Nigel Thomas
David Thouless
Sir Mark Tully
Keith Ward
Rachel Weisz
Sir Simon Wessely

References

Contact Directory

Fellows of Trinity Hall, Cambridge
Trinity Hall, Cambridge
Trinity Hall